Professor Dato' Dr. A. Razak Mohaideen (born 22 January 1965) is a Malaysian film director. He has directed around 40 titles since 1996.

Early life 
He was born in Pulau Pinang on 22 January 1965. Razak obtained his Master of Art in Film and Television Fiction from Sheffield Hallam University, United Kingdom in the year 1997. After obtaining a bachelor's degree in Journalism, Razak started as a script writer before moving on to directing. He debuted as a director with the film Gemerlapan in the same year. He became a lecturer in Universiti Teknologi MARA since 1991, eventually serving as the Dean of Faculty of Film, Theatre & Animation there. He is also one of the lecturers involved in the setting up of its Faculty of Performing Arts in 1998. In October 2016, he obtained his PhD  in Management from the University Utara Malaysia.

He is married to Datin Nazeera Ahmed Bazari and has two children, Batrisyia Abdul Razak and Aniq Aqil Abdul Razak.

Honours 
He won a Special Jury Award for Portraying Social Community Culture and was the Producer of one of the Best Short Films at the 2007 RTM Short Film Awards. In 2011, he has been awarded National Academic Award (Creative) and received Malaysia Book of Records for directing most number of film by an academician.

 :

  Officer of the Order of the Defender of State (DSPN) – Dato' (2014)

Filmography

Film

Television series

Telemovie

References

External links
Abdul Razak at Sinema Malaysia

1965 births
Living people
People from Penang
Malaysian people of Malay descent
Malaysian Muslims
Malaysian people of Indian descent
Malaysian film directors
Academic staff of Universiti Teknologi MARA
Malay-language film directors